Kiedrzyn is a dzielnica (district) of Częstochowa, Silesian Voivodeship, southern Poland. It is located in the north-west part of the city, between roads to Łask and Działoszyn. Kiedrzyn has an area of 7.77 km2 and on April 30, 2014 had 2,940 inhabitants.

Kiedrzyn is called "the district of florists" - majority of the houses have their own greenhouses.

In district is located local sport club Orzeł Kiedrzyn and since 1922 Volunteer Fire Brigade. In Kiedrzyn are 2 churches: Church of St. Brother Albert Chmielowski and Church of St. Andrew Bobola. 

Kiedrzyn is connected to the city by public transport. The bus line number 13 runs through the district.

References 

Częstochowa
Neighbourhoods in Silesian Voivodeship